Eichenberger Bach is a small river of Bavaria, Germany. It flows into the Sailaufbach in Sailauf.

See also
List of rivers of Bavaria

Rivers of Bavaria
Rivers of the Spessart
Rivers of Germany